The Minister for Democracy (Swedish: Demokratiministern) is a cabinet minister within the Swedish Government and appointed by the Prime Minister of Sweden.

The minister is responsible for issues regarding democracy.

Lists of Ministers for Democracy

Ministry history 
The office of Minister for Democracy have been under several different ministries since its founding in 1998.

References

Government ministers of Sweden